The Panther Model 100 was a British motorcycle. It had a 598 cc, 6.5:1 compression ratio, OHV sloper engine in a frame where the engine replaces the front down-tube. Panthers were manufactured in Cleckheaton, Yorkshire from 1900 to 1967. Launched in 1932, the Model 100 continued through to 1963. While the engine and overall layout stayed essentially the same, the specifications steadily evolved over these thirty or so years.

Development 

A 598cc engine was used in the Model 85 Redwing (previously Model 80) from 1929 to 1930 and the Model 60 (previously Model 3) from 1928 to 1935. The Model 100 engine was largely a development from the Model 60. The earlier engines had compression ratios of either 5.4:1 (Model 60 pre-1930) or 7.0:1 (Model 85 and Model 60 post-1929). The frame derives from the 1928 Panther and the tank from the 1932 Model 50. The history of the development of the Model 100 is as follows.

1932 - Model 100 launched. P&M 4-speed gearbox, Webb forks.

1933 - Sturmey-Archer 4-speed, hand-change gearbox introduced. Frame redesigned. Terry de luxe saddle.

1934 - Burman 4-speed foot-change gearbox introduced
 
1935 - Deeply finned sump and improved lubrication. This new bottom end remained almost unchanged for the next thirty years. This machine had a 6.5:1 compression ratio, ohv sloper engine.
The 1935 Model 100 was the machine on which Miss Florence Blenkiron and Miss Teresa Wallach undertook the epic journey from London to Cape Town, crossing the Sahara: the first such journey on a motorcycle combination.

1937 - New fully chromed fuel tank with red and black lined cream panels and snarling Panther logo.  This was the last year of the "Redwing" Model 100

1938 - Kidney-shaped rocker cover introduced. Redwing designation dropped

1939 - Miller Dynamag replaces BTH magneto. 3.5 gallon tank introduced

1940 - Production ceased for World War II

1946 - Production resumed after war. Lucas magneto introduced.

1947 - Dowty Oleomatic forks introduced

1950 - Manual advance/retard reintroduced

1952 - Lucas Magdyno introduced

1954 - Swinging arm Model 100 introduced. Four gallon tank. Panther forks.

1955 - Amal 376 introduced

1956 - Amal 389 introduced. Heavy duty, sidecar trail Panther forks.

1957 - Swinging arm Model 100 de luxe introduced. Last year of rigid Model 100. Dualseat as standard.

1963 - Model 100 last manufactured. It was the end of the line for 600 cc four stroke heavyweights. The 650 cc Model 120 continued for another three years

Sources

See also
List of motorcycles of the 1930s
List of motorcycles of the 1940s
List of motorcycles of the 1950s

External links
Panther Model 100 at The Panther Page
PANTHER Model: 598cc, 100. Technical Specs

Model 100